The Martyrology of Usuard is a work by Usuard, a  monk of the Benedictine Abbey of Saint-Germain-des-Prés. The prologue is dedicated to Charles the Bald indicating that it was undertaken at that monarch's instigation. It was apparently written shortly before the author's death in 875.

Usuard was a prominent member of his order and he had been sent on a mission to Spain in 858 to procure certain important relics, of which journey an account is still preserved.  The martyrology which bears his name, a compilation upon which the later Roman Martyrology depended closely until the twentieth century, remained throughout the Middle Ages the most famous document of its kind. It is preserved to us in innumerable manuscripts, of which Henri Quentin gives a partial list (Martyrologes historiques, 1908, pp. 675–7).

The full story of the relation of the texts was unravelled for the first time by Quentin, and the evolution of the early medieval martyrologia culminating in Usuard's work was told by Quentin in the book just cited. Usuard provided what was substantially an abridgement of Ado's Martyrology in a form better adapted for practical liturgical use. In certain points, however, Usuard reverted to a Lyonese recension of Bede's augmented Martyrology, which was attributed to the archdeacon Florus of Lyon.

The text of Usuard's Martyrologium was edited by Jacques Bouillart (Paris, 1718) from manuscript Latini 13745 at Paris, which, if not the autograph of the author, dates at any rate from his time. A still more elaborate edition was brought out by the Bollandist Father Jean-Baptiste Du Sollier.

In the thirteenth century the Dominican Order adopted Usuard's as the basis for their own martyrology.

Notes

Sources
Martyrology of Usuard

External links
 Opera Omnia by Migne Patrologia Latina with analytical indexes

Martyrologies